Ever in My Heart is a 1933 American pre-Code drama film directed by Archie Mayo and starring Barbara Stanwyck, Otto Kruger, and Ralph Bellamy. It portrays the tragic consequences of the virulent propaganda that spread false stories of atrocities and stigmatized anything German during the Great War.

Plot 
In 1909 in the town of Archedale, Mary Archer, an American girl from the prominent Archer family, meets Hugo Wilbrandt, a German chemist who knows her cousin and childhood sweetheart Jeff. It had been assumed for years that Mary and Jeff would marry someday, but Mary falls in love with Hugo and he with her. They soon marry and start a family.

Hugo enthustically adopts his new country and becomes an American citizen on the eve of World War I. Allied propaganda soon promotes anti-German sentiment, which eventually costs Hugo his professorship at the local university. Hard times fall on the family, and the Wilbrandts' young son Teddy dies. Hugo convinces Mary to return to her parents' home, with a promise that he will soon follow. 

Hugo later sends Mary a letter stating that although he is now a citizen, he is not being accepted as an American. He also informs her at the end of the letter that he is returning to Europe to fight for his people. Mary is devastated and divorces Hugo.

Mary volunteers her time in a USO-like organization supporting the American war effort. Mary goes to France where she meets two new arrivals, Martha Sewell and Serena Honeywell, who are petrified that they will be taken prisoner and ravished by the Germans. Martha even brings along a pistol for protection and poison pills to take if she is captured. Mary quickly confiscates them. 

The U.S.  Army is just about to kick off their Meuse-Argonne Offensive, but there are rumors that nearby there is a German spy who is collecting information. In a canteen, Mary recognizes Hugo dressed in a US Army uniform and urges him to escape because she realizes she still loves him. Hugo leaves just as Jeff arrives looking for the spy. Knowing that Jeff would immediately recognize Hugo, Mary diverts Jeff's attention long enough for Hugo to get away safely.

Upon returning to her room, Mary finds Hugo there and they share a night together. As Hugo prepares to leave, Mary is torn between her love for Hugo and her duty to protect the lives of hundreds of American soldiers. She asks Hugo to delay his departure until dawn and to have a glass of wine with her before he goes. Mary prepares two glasses of wine but secretly drops poison pills in each. They toast their love for each other while troops outside march off to battle.

Cast
 Barbara Stanwyck as Mary Archer Wilbrandt
 Otto Kruger as Hugo Wilbrandt
 Ralph Bellamy as Jeff
 Ruth Donnelly as Lizzie
 Laura Hope Crews as Grandma Caroline Archer
 Frank Albertson as Sam Archer
 Ronnie Cosby as Teddy Wilbrandt
 Clara Blandick as Anna
 Elizabeth Patterson as Clara Tuttle, canteen worker
 Willard Robertson as Kennel Caretaker
 Nella Walker as Martha Sewell
 Harry Beresford as Eli
 Virginia Howell as Serena Honeywell
 Ethel Wales as Miss Honeywell, canteen worker
 Wallis Clark as Enoch Sewell (uncredited) 
 Frank Reicher as Dr. Hoffman (uncredited)

Production
Star Barbara Stanwyck did not look back with favor on the five films she made under contract to Warner Bros., which were generally referred to as "women's programmers" or "weepers", although it has been noted that "[s]ome of Stanwyck's finest performances come from [those] early pictures."

Beulah Marie Dix, who co-wrote the story Ever in My Heart was based on, and whose career as a screenwriter bridged the silent and sound eras, founded the screenplay department of the Famous Players-Lasky studio with Cecil B. DeMille's brother William DeMille.

Reception 
TCM writer Greg Ferrara observed that "Ever in My Heart has fallen into obscurity but deserves a revival of interest. It covers difficult subject matter in a surprisingly straightforward and honest manner and though its story takes place during World War I, it has much to say about some of the very things that affect so many people today, all over the world. It remains relevant and most importantly, remains one of Barbara Stanwyck's best early efforts."

References

External links

1933 films
1933 romantic drama films
American romantic drama films
American black-and-white films
American World War I films
Films directed by Archie Mayo
Films set in 1909
Films set in the 1910s
Warner Bros. films
Films set on the United States home front during World War I
1930s English-language films
1930s American films
Films scored by Bernhard Kaun
Anti-German sentiment in the United States
Films about racism in the United States